The 1998–99 NBA season was the Wizards' 38th season in the National Basketball Association. On March 23, 1998, the owners of all 29 NBA teams voted 27–2 to reopen the league's collective bargaining agreement, seeking changes to the league's salary cap system, and a ceiling on individual player salaries. The National Basketball Players Association (NBPA) opposed to the owners' plan, and wanted raises for players who earned the league's minimum salary. After both sides failed to reach an agreement, the owners called for a lockout, which began on July 1, 1998, putting a hold on all team trades, free agent signings and training camp workouts, and cancelling many NBA regular season and preseason games. Due to the lockout, the NBA All-Star Game, which was scheduled to be played in Philadelphia on February 14, 1999, was also cancelled. However, on January 6, 1999, NBA commissioner David Stern, and NBPA director Billy Hunter finally reached an agreement to end the lockout. The deal was approved by both the players and owners, and was signed on January 20, ending the lockout after 204 days. The regular season began on February 5, and was cut short to just 50 games instead of the regular 82-game schedule.

Prior to the start of the season, the Wizards acquired All-Star guard Mitch Richmond and Otis Thorpe from the Sacramento Kings. However, after a 4–4 start to the season, the Wizards continued to under achieve playing below .500 for the rest of the season. Head coach Bernie Bickerstaff was fired after a 13–19 start, and was replaced with assistant Jim Brovelli as an interim coach, and Juwan Howard only played 36 games due to an ankle injury. The team posted a 7-game losing streak in April, and lost nine of their final eleven games finishing sixth in the Atlantic Division with a disappointing 18–32 record.

Richmond led the team in scoring averaging 19.7 points per game, while Howard averaged 18.9 points and 8.1 rebounds per game, and Rod Strickland provided the team with 15.7 points and 9.9 assists per game. In addition, Thorpe provided with 11.3 points and 6.8 rebounds per game, while Calbert Cheaney contributed 7.7 points per game off the bench, and Ben Wallace led the team with 8.3 rebounds and 2.0 blocks per game.

Following the season, Thorpe signed as a free agent with the Miami Heat, while Cheaney signed with the Boston Celtics, Wallace, Terry Davis and Tim Legler were all traded to the Orlando Magic, who then released Davis and Legler to free agency, and Brovelli was fired as head coach.

Draft picks

Roster

Roster Notes
 Center Lorenzo Williams missed the entire season due to a foot fractures injury.

Regular season

Season standings

z - clinched division title
y - clinched division title
x - clinched playoff spot

Record vs. opponents

Game log

Player statistics

NOTE: Please write the players statistics in alphabetical order by last name.

Awards and records

Transactions

References

See also
 1998-99 NBA season

Washington Wizards seasons
Wash
Wiz
Wiz